Jennings High School may refer to:

Jennings High School (Jennings, Florida) in Jennings, Florida
Jennings High School (Kansas) in Jennings, Kansas
Jennings High School (Louisiana) in Jennings, Louisiana
Jennings High School (Missouri) in Jennings, Missouri